Cento is a town and comune in the province of Ferrara, Emilia-Romagna, Italy.

History
The name Cento is a reference to the centuriation of the Po Valley. Cento's growth from its origin as a little fishing village in the marshes to an established farming town took place in the first few centuries in the second millennium.

The Bishop of Bologna and the Abbot of Nonantola established the Partecipanza Agraria, an institution in which land would perpetually be redistributed every twenty years among the male heirs of the families who constituted the initial core of the community in the 12th century.

In 1502 Pope Alexander VI took it away from the dominion of the Bishop of Bologna and made it part of the dowry of his daughter Lucrezia Borgia, betrothed to Duke Alfonso I d'Este. It was later returned to the Papal States in 1598.

South-east of the city lies the small historic fortification of Pieve di Cento.

Main sights
Palazzo del Monte di Pietà (18th century), housing the Civic Gallery. It has paintings by the local artist Guercino. The latter's works can be seen also in the Basilica Collegiata San Biagio, Santa Maria dei Servi, the church of the Rosary, also designed by him, and, in the frazione of Corporeno, the 14th-century church of San Giorgio.
The Rocca (Castle), a massive square building with square towers. Built in 1378 by the bishop of Bologna, it was enlarged by Giulio della Rovere, the future pope Julius II, in 1460.
Palazzo del Governatore (Governor's Palace, 1502). It is home to the Galleria d'arte moderna Aroldo Bonzagni.
Porta Pieve (14th century), the sole surviving gate of the four once existing.

Culture
Cento is the European's city of Carnival and it is twinned with Rio carnival.

People
 Marco Zoppo, painter
 Benedetto Gennari, painter
 Cesare Cremonini, philosopher
 Giovan Francesco Barbieri best known as Il Guercino, painter
 Bartolomeo Gennari, painter
 Ercole Gennari, painter
 Benedetto Gennari II, painter
 Cesare Gennari, painter
 Benjamin D'Israeli, grandfather of British Prime Minister Benjamin Disraeli
 Antonio Lamberto Rusconi, cardinal
 Bartolomeo Campagnoli, violinist
 Giuseppe Alberghini, cardinal
 Ugo Bassi, patriot
 Leone Carpi, political, economist and journalist
 Giuseppe Borgatti, tenor
 Aroldo Bonzagni, painter
 Carmen Lenzi Mozzani, classical guitarist
 Mario Maccaferri, classical guitarist, lutist as well as guitar and ukulele maker
 Giovanni Malagodi,  politician and economist
 Ferruccio Lamborghini, industrialist
 Corrado Ardizzoni, Olympic cyclist 
 Jessica Rossi, sports shooter
 Luigi Mozzani, classical guitarist as well as guitar and violin maker

Trivia

The nearby center of Renazzo is known in the astronomical community because of the Renazzo meteorite, which fell in 1824 and it is considered the prototype of a class of carbonaceous chondrites known as "CR group" (where the "R" comes from the name Renazzo).

International relations

Cento is twinned with:
 L'Aquila, Italy
 Székesfehérvár, Hungary
 Vicente Lopez, Argentina

References

External links

Official website 
Other information 

 
Castles in Italy
Cities and towns in Emilia-Romagna
Municipalities of the Province of Ferrara